Labored respiration or labored breathing is an abnormal respiration characterized by evidence of increased effort to breathe, including the use of accessory muscles of respiration, stridor, grunting, or nasal flaring.

Classification
Labored breathing is distinguished from shortness of breath or dyspnea, which is the sensation of respiratory distress rather than a physical presentation.

Still, many simply define dyspnea as difficulty in breathing without further specification, which may confuse it with e.g. labored breathing or tachypnea (rapid breathing). Labored breathing has occasionally been included in the definition of dyspnea as well. However, in the standard definition, these related signs may be present at the same time, but do not necessarily have to be. For instance, in respiratory arrest by a primary failure in respiratory muscles the patient, if conscious, may experience dyspnea, yet without having any labored breathing or tachypnea. The other way around, labored breathing or tachypnea can voluntarily be performed even when there is no dyspnea.

Presentations

Presentations of labored respiration include:
 Hyperpnea - faster and/or deeper breathing 
 Tachypnea - increased breathing rate
 Retractions or recessions – sucking in of the skin, around the ribs and the top of the sternum
 Use of accessory muscles of respiration rather than only the diaphragm

Causes
Causes of labored breathing include:
 Severe metabolic acidosis, particularly diabetic ketoacidosis (DKA) but also kidney failure. The specific associated breathing pattern is called Kussmaul breathing.
 Cardiac disease
 Respiratory failure

See also
 List of terms of lung size and activity
Agonal respiration, a specific type of abnormal breathing pattern

References

Breathing abnormalities